Horsley is a village and civil parish about one and a half miles south-west of the small Cotswold market town of Nailsworth. The origins of the name Horsley are much debated, although it is thought to be derived from the pre-7th-century Old English phrase, "horse-lega", meaning "place of horses".

A habitation was recorded in 1327 at Barton End, named after a barton on the manor estate. The village sprung from cross-roads east of St Martin Church. The Parish is bisected from south to north by the Bath-Gloucester, built in 1780.

History
Historically Horsley had a prison, part of which is now a house, the exercise yard now a garden.

Horsley Court on Narrowcut Lane dates back to c1690. The house was altered and enlarged c1820, with a central tower added in c1850. It was built for the Webb family of clothiers.

Geography 
In the parish is the hamlet of Newmarket, Gloucestershire.

Facilities
Horsley has a C of E Primary School and church, a community shop, a playground and sports field, a village hall, Ruskin Mill College (part of Ruskin Mill Trust), and a pub, The Hog (formerly the Bell & Castle). St Martin's Church also serves as the Primary School hall and a performance space for the community and surrounding area.

Publications
Horsley's monthly newsletter, 'The Horse's Mouth' provides local news and serves as the church's parish magazine.

References

External links

Horsley Village Website
Ruskin Mill Trust Website
History of Horsley  Website
 Stroud Voices (Horsley filter) – oral history site

Villages in Gloucestershire
Civil parishes in Gloucestershire
Stroud District